Non-commercial advertising is sponsored by or for a charitable institution or civic group or religious or political organization. Many noncommercial advertisements seek money and placed in the hope of raising funds. Others hope to change consumer behavior. So the main goals of noncommercial advertising are:
Stimulate inquires for information
Popularize social cause
Change activity habits
Decrease waste of resources
Communicate political viewpoint
Improve public attitude
Remind people to give again.

So called word-of-mouth advertising is a person to person communication that is perceived as being noncommercial, concerning goods or services: it is face-to-face product related communications between and among the friends, relatives and others. Because it is noncommercial, it is usually seen as being an unbiased source of information.

See also
 Advertising campaign
 Civil society campaign
 Political campaign

Advertising
Non-commercial